The 2005 Conference USA men's soccer tournament was the eleventh edition of the Conference USA Men's Soccer Tournament. The tournament decided the Conference USA champion and guaranteed representative into the 2005 NCAA Division I Men's Soccer Championship. The tournament was hosted by Southern Methodist University and the games were played at Westcott Field.

Bracket

Schedule

Quarterfinals

Semifinals

Final

Statistics

Goalscorers

Own goal
Robert Sheringham (UAB scored for Memphis)

Awards

All-Tournament team
Michael Coburn, Memphis 
Tripp Harkins, Memphis 
Nick Ademolu, Marshall 
Jeremy Ashe, Marshall 
Kyle Brown, Tulsa
Lawson Vaughn, Tulsa 
Daniel Wasson, Tulsa 
Mike Gustavson, South Carolina 
Ryan Leeton, South Carolina 
Ralph Pace, South Carolina 
Eric Szeszycki, South Carolina

References

External links
 

Conference USA Men's Soccer Tournament
Sports in the Dallas–Fort Worth metroplex
Tournament
Conference USA Men's Soccer Tournament
Conference USA Men's Soccer Tournament